Hazrati Sultan District is a district in Samangan Province, Afghanistan. It is also locally known as Azrat Sultan. In 2019 the estimated population was 45,962.

References

Districts of Samangan Province